Ottowia beijingensis is a Gram-negative bacterium from the genus Ottowia. It has been isolated from activated sludge from Beijing in China.

References

Comamonadaceae
Bacteria described in 2014